Rasputin (French: Raspoutine) is a 1954 French-Italian historical drama film directed by Georges Combret and starring Pierre Brasseur, Isa Miranda and Renée Faure. It portrays the rise and fall of the Russian priest and courtier Grigori Rasputin.

The film's sets were designed by the art director Jean Douarinou.

Plot 
The muzhik Rasputin becomes the favorite of the court of the Tsar of Russia after curing the Tsar's son. He seduced the tsarina, he is accused of witchcraft, and a plot is organized.

Cast
 Pierre Brasseur as Gregory Iefimovich Raspoutine  
 Isa Miranda as La tsarine Alexandra  
 Renée Faure as Véra  
 Milly Vitale as Laura  
 Jacques Berthier as Le prince Félix Youssoupoff / Youry  
 Claude Laydu as Héliodore  
 Denise Grey as La princesse Dikvona  
 Micheline Francey as Anna Pracova  
 Robert Berri as Le capitaine Soukoff  
 Jean Wall as L'archimandrite Breham  
 Raphaël Patorni as Le ministre Stumerof  
 Michel Etcheverry as Pourlchkevitch 
 Bruno Balp 
 Nadine Bellaigue 
 Charles Bouillaud as L'industriel Posinoff  
 Maria Grazia Buccella 
 Robert Burnier as Le tsar Nicolas II  
 Pierre Cosson 
 Germaine Delbat as La concierge  
 Cécile Didier as La nourrice  
 Ky Duyen as Le pédicure  
 Cécile Eddy 
 Richard Flagey as Dimitri  
 Suzanne Grey as L'employée aux bains  
 Jean Lanier as Le docteur  
 Anne Laurent 
 Robert Lombard as Boris Goulief  
 Jean-Claude Maurice 
 Alexandre Mihalesco 
 René Pascal 
 Roland Piguet 
 Sacha Pitoëff as Le chef de la police  
 Roger Saget as La basse  
 Jean Thielment as Le garçon de bains  
 Jacques Todescano 
 Hélène Vallier as Une infirmière  
 Jany Vallières as Une dame

References

Bibliography
 Orio Caldiron & Matilde Hochkofler. Isa Miranda. Gremese Editore, 1978.

External links

1954 films
1950s historical drama films
French historical drama films
Italian historical drama films
1950s French-language films
Films directed by Georges Combret
Films set in the 1910s
Films set in Russia
Films about Grigori Rasputin
Cultural depictions of Nicholas II of Russia
Biographical films about Russian royalty
1950s Italian films
1950s French films